Jacques Duquesne may refer to:
Jacques Duquesne (footballer) (born 1940), Belgian footballer
Jacques DuQuesne, the Swordsman of Marvel Comics